Cuento de Navidad (English: A Christmas Carol), is a Mexican telenovela produced by Eugenio Cobo for Televisa in 1999. It is an adaptation of the 1843 eponymous novel by the famed English writer Charles Dickens.

Notable cast 
Luz María Aguilar as Doña Petra
Julio Alemán as Severo Rubiales Conde
Chantal Andere as Beatriz "Betty"
Eduardo Santamarina as Angel
María Sorté as María
Karla Álvarez as Miriam
Leticia Calderón as Spirit of Christmas Yet to Come
Itatí Cantoral as Sebring Cirrus
Fernando Colunga as Jaime Rodríguez Coder
Luis Couturier as Fernando Soto del Monte
Laura Flores as An angel (The pretty woman)
Susana González as Miní
Eleazar Gómez as Kevin
Edith González as Josefina Coder
Rafael Inclán as Pavón
Aaron Hernan as Don Leonardo
Mauricio Islas as Edmundo Soto
Eugenio Derbez as Nurse
Arath de la Torre as José
Ernesto Laguardia as Miguel
Andrea Lagunés as Angel
Juan Peláez as Santa Claus
Mariana Levy as Guadalupe "Lupita"
Pedro Armendáriz Jr.
Nuria Bages
Roberto Ballesteros
Luis Bayardo
Ricardo Chávez
Eric del Castillo
Alberto Estrella
Ana Layevska
Ivonne Montero
Adriana Nieto
Manuel Ojeda
Arturo Peniche

See also
 List of Christmas films

References

External links 

1999 telenovelas
1999 Mexican television series debuts
2000 Mexican television series endings
Mexican telenovelas
Televisa telenovelas
Spanish-language telenovelas
Christmas television series
Television shows based on A Christmas Carol